Zdzisław Starzyński (25 May 1932 – 30 January 2003) was a Polish field hockey player. He competed in the men's tournament at the 1952 Summer Olympics.

References

External links
 

1932 births
2003 deaths
Polish male field hockey players
Olympic field hockey players of Poland
Field hockey players at the 1952 Summer Olympics
Sportspeople from Poznań
People from Poznań Voivodeship (1921–1939)